Mexicana Universal Colima is a pageant in Colima, Mexico, that selects that state's representative for the national Mexicana Universal pageant.

The State Organization has produced one Winner for Miss Universe in 2018, one Winner for Miss World in 2006 and three designated for Miss International in 2014 , 2019 and 2022.

Mexicana Universal Colima is located at number 8 with four crowns of Nuestra Belleza México/Mexicana Universal.

Titleholders
Below are the names of the annual titleholders of Mexicana Universal Colima, listed in ascending order, and their final placements in the Mexicana Universal after their participation, until 2017 the names are as Nuestra Belleza Colima.

{| class="sortable" border="1" cellpadding="2" cellspacing="0" style="margin: 0 1em 0 0; background: white; border: 1px #aaa solid; border-collapse: collapse; font-size: 95%;"
|-
! bgcolor="#EAEAEA" | Year
! bgcolor="#EAEAEA" | Titleholder
! bgcolor="#EAEAEA" | Hometown
! bgcolor="#EAEAEA" | National Placement
! bgcolor="#EAEAEA" | National Award
! bgcolor="#EAEAEA" | Notes
|-
| align="center" | 2022
| align="center" | Valeria Villanueva
| align="center" | Manzanillo
| align="center" | TBD
| align="center" | TBD
| align="center" | 
|-bgcolor="#FFFFCF"
| align="center" | 2021
| align="center" | Itzia Margarita García Jiménez
| align="center" | Manzanillo
| align="center" | Mexicana Internacional
| align="center" |
| align="center" | Will compete in Miss International 2023
|-
| align="center" | 2020
!colspan="6"!
|-
| align="center" | 2019
| Ivonne Lizeth Barocio Sandoval
| align="center" | Villa de Álvarez
| align="center" | Top 10
| align="center" |
| align="center" | 
|-
| align="center" | 2018
| Ángela Margarita Delgado Hernández 
| align="center" | Tecomán
| align="center" | 2nd Runner-up
| align="center" | 
| align="center" | 
|-
| align="center" bgcolor="#FFE1F5"| 2017
| bgcolor="#FFE1F5"| Andrea Isabel Toscano Ramírez1| align="center" bgcolor="#FFE1F5"| Manzanillo| align="center" bgcolor="#FFE1F5"| Mexicana Universal| align="center" bgcolor="#FFE1F5"| Personality FraicheBest National Costume| align="center" bgcolor="#FFE1F5" | 1st Runner-up in Miss International 2019Competed in Miss Universe 2018|-
| colspan="7" bgcolor="#EAEAEA" style="text-align:center;"| Until 2016 the Title was Nuestra Belleza Colima|-
|-
| align="center" | 2016
| Margarita Magaña Vega 
| align="center" | Colima
| align="center" | Top 15
| align="center" | Miss Top Model
| align="center" | 
|-
| align="center" | 2015
| Giovanna Salazar García
| align="center" | Villa de Álvarez
| align="center" | Top 15
| align="center" |
| align="center" | 
|-
| align="center" bgcolor="#FFFFCF"| 2014| bgcolor="#FFFFCF"| Lorena Marlene Sevilla Mesina| align="center" bgcolor="#FFFFCF"| Colima| align="center" bgcolor="#FFFFCF"| 2nd Runner-upNuestra Belleza Internacional México(Designated)| align="center" bgcolor="#FFFFCF"| Miss Talent| align="center" bgcolor="#FFFFCF"|   Top 10 in Miss International 2015|-
| align="center" | 2013
| Karen Estefanía Arceo Gallegos
| align="center" | Colima
| align="center" | -
| align="center" | 
| align="center" | 
|-
| align="center" | 2012
| Mirna Guadalupe Parra Orozco
| align="center" | Armería
| align="center" |-
| align="center" | 
| align="center" | Competed in Reina de la Feria deTodos los Santos Colima 2011Reina Armería 2010
|-
| align="center" | 2011
| Ana Karen Martínez Salazar
| align="center" | Manzanillo
| align="center" | -
| align="center" | 
| align="center" | 
|-
| align="center" | 2010
| Brenda Geraldine Valencia Madrigal 
| align="center" | Villa de Álvarez
| align="center" | Did not Compete
| align="center" |
| align="center" | Reina de la Feria de Todos los Santos Colima 2009
|-
| align="center" | 2009
| Giannina Giselle Huerta Dueñas
| align="center" | Villa de Alvarez
| align="center" | -
| align="center" | 
| align="center" | Top 15 in Miss Tourism Queenof the Year International 2010Miss Tourism Queen México 2010
|-
| align="center" | 2008
| Roxana Espinoza Morentin
| align="center" | Villa de Álvarez
| align="center" | -
| align="center" | 
| align="center" |  
|-	
| align="center" | 2007
| Irene Chavira Maravilla
| align="center" | Manzanillo
| align="center" | 3rd Runner-up
| align="center" |
| align="center" |
|-
| align="center" bgcolor="#CFF0FF"| 2006| bgcolor="#CFF0FF"| Carolina Morán Gordillo| align="center" bgcolor="#CFF0FF"| Manzanillo| align="center" bgcolor="#CFF0FF"| Nuestra Belleza Mundo México| align="center" bgcolor="#CFF0FF"| Contestans' Choice| align="center" bgcolor="#CFF0FF"| 2nd Runner-up in Miss World 2007Miss World Americas|-
| align="center" | 2005
!colspan="6" rowspan=2 !
|-
| align="center" | 2004
|-
| align="center" | 2003
| Karina Gutiérrez Verdugo
| align="center" | Colima
| align="center" | -
| align="center" |  
| align="center" | 
|-
| align="center" | 2002
| Edith Marisol García Hernández
| align="center" | Colima
| align="center" | -
| align="center" |  
| align="center" |  
|- 	
| align="center" | 2001
| Laura Tayde Mancilla Alonso
| align="center" | Colima
| align="center" | -
| align="center" |  
| align="center" | 
|-
| align="center" | 2000
| Martha Yadira Martínez
| align="center" | Colima
| align="center" | Top 20
| align="center" |  
| align="center" | 
|-
| align="center" | 1999
| Marcela Bueno Reyes
| align="center" | Colima
| align="center" | -
| align="center" |  
| align="center" |
|-
| align="center" |1998
| Denisse Zarai Guzmán
| align="center" |Colima
| align="center" | -
| align="center" | 
| align="center" | Miss Costa Maya International 1999Miss Costa Maya México 1999
|-
| align="center" | 1997
| Karla Ofelia Cortéz Figueroa
| align="center" | Colima
| align="center" | Top 16
| align="center" |  
| align="center" | 
|-
| align="center" | 1996
| Alma Alicia de la Torre Robledo
| align="center" | Colima
| align="center" | -
| align="center" |  
| align="center" | 
|-
| align="center" | 1995
| Martha Peréz Rodríguez
| align="center" | Colima
| align="center" | Top 16
| align="center" |  
| align="center" | 
|-
| align="center" | 1994
| Gloría Michel Ramírez 
| align="center" | Colima
| align="center" | Top 6
| align="center" |  
| align="center" | 
|}1 She was selected by Mexicana Universal Organization to represent Mexico in Miss International beauty pageant.

 Competed in Miss Universe.
 Competed in Miss World.
 Competed in Miss International.
 Competed in Miss Charm International.
 Competed in Miss Continente Americano.
 Competed in Reina Hispanoamericana.
 Competed in Miss Orb International.
 Competed in Nuestra Latinoamericana Universal.

Designated Contestants
As of 2000, isn't uncommon for some States to have more than one delegate competing simultaneously in the national pageant. The following Nuestra Belleza Colima''' contestants were invited to compete in Nuestra Belleza México only in 2001.

External links
Official Website

Nuestra Belleza México